The 1923 Walker Cup, the second Walker Cup Match, was a team golf match played on 18 and 19 May 1923 on the Old Course at St Andrews in Fife, Scotland. The United States won 6 to 5, with one match halved.

Format
There were ten players in each team. Four 36-hole matches of foursomes were played on Friday and eight singles matches on Saturday. Each of the 12 matches was worth one point in the larger team competition. Matches level after 36 holes were halved.

Teams

Team Great Britain

Playing captain:  Robert Harris
 John Caven
 Ernest Holderness
 Chubby Hooman
 William Hope
 Willis Mackenzie
 William Murray
 Cyril Tolley
 Roger Wethered
 John Wilson

Orme Bristowe was the reserve. John Caven was not selected for any matches.

Team United States

Playing captain: Robert Gardner
Davidson Herron
Jimmy Johnston
Max Marston
Jack Neville
Francis Ouimet
George Rotan
Jess Sweetser
Oscar Willing
Fred Wright

Friday's foursomes

Saturday's singles

References

Walker Cup
Golf tournaments in Scotland
Walker Cup
Walker Cup